Francisco Javier Mier Campillo (1748–1818) was a Spanish bishop who was Grand Inquisitor of Spain from 1814 to 1818.

Biography

Francisco Javier Mier Campillo was born in Alles near Peñamellera Alta on February 18, 1748.

He was appointed Bishop of Almería on May 24, 1802, and he was consecrated as a bishop in September 1802.  When the Spanish Inquisition was re-established in 1814, he became Grand Inquisitor of Spain, a post he held until his death.  He resigned as Bishop of Almería on December 16, 1815.

He died on May 20, 1818.

References

1748 births
1818 deaths
Grand Inquisitors of Spain
19th-century Roman Catholic bishops in Spain